Carteret County Home is a historic poorhouse located at Beaufort, Carteret County, North Carolina. It was built in 1914, and enlarged in 1917.  It is a one-story gable-front frame structure with a two-story center section patterned after the hall and parlor plan. The Carteret County Home operated until 1943, and later converted to apartments.

It was listed on the National Register of Historic Places in 1994.

References

Government buildings on the National Register of Historic Places in North Carolina
Government buildings completed in 1914
Buildings and structures in Carteret County, North Carolina
National Register of Historic Places in Carteret County, North Carolina